The Ministry of Environment of Peru is the government ministry responsible for the national policy regarding environmental matters. It was created on May 13, 2008. Its function is to oversee the environmental sector of Peru, with the authority to design, establish, and execute government policies concerning the environment. It has two subdivisions:

Strategic Development of Natural Resources
Environmental Management

It also has an Advisory Commission. The inaugural holder was Antonio Brack Egg. , the minister is Albina Ruiz.

See also
Climate of Peru
Council of Ministers of Peru

Environment
Peru
Peru, Environment
Peru
Peru